Dušan Nedić (born 28 January 1975) is a Montenegrin professional basketball coach and former player.

Professional career 
A power forward, Nedić played for Mornar, Radnički Beograd, Wevelgem, Crvena zvezda, Carrefour Aveiro (Portugal), Makedonikos, SLUC Nancy, and Hyères-Toulon. He retired as a player with Hyères-Toulon in 2007.

References

External links
 
 Dusan Nedic at eurobasket.com
 Dusan Nedic at proballers.com
 Dusan Nedic at basketball-reference.com
 Dusan Nedic at realgm.com

1975 births
Living people
Aurora University alumni
HTV Basket players
BKK Radnički players
KK Crvena zvezda players
KK Mornar Bar players
Makedonikos B.C. players
Montenegrin basketball coaches
Montenegrin expatriate basketball people in Belgium
Montenegrin expatriate basketball people in Greece
Montenegrin expatriate basketball people in France
Montenegrin expatriate basketball people in Serbia
Montenegrin men's basketball players
People from Bar, Montenegro
SLUC Nancy Basket players